Józef Cukier (November 14, 1889, Zakopane – April 22, 1960, Zakopane) was one of the leaders of the Goralenvolk during World War II. Having been a president of the Highlander Union before the German invasion, he tried along with Wacław Krzeptowski to establish an independent state for his ethnic group by collaborating with the occupiers. The attempt failed due to lack of support among the local population.

References

1889 births
1960 deaths
Polish collaborators with Nazi Germany
Polish Gorals